Husseini (also spelled Hussaini, Husaini, Hecini, Hosseini , Houssaini or Husayni) is an Arabic surname.

Etymology
It is a nisba derivation of the given name Hussein or Husain from the name of Imam Husain ibn Ali. People with the surname El-Husseini, Al-Husseini, Al-Husaini or Husseini are descendants of the Islamic prophet Muhammad through the lineage of his grandson Imam Husain ibn Ali. Imam Husain ibn Ali was the son of Muhammad's daughter Fatima and Caliph Imam Ali ibn Abi Talib. 

Husseinis are primarily found in the Arab world, Palestine, South Asia, Iran, Iraq, India, Afghanistan, and Gulf Countries. Because of their lineage, the Husseini family is considered one to be respected, honored and are given the title of Sayyid. This title represents a person who is a direct descendant of Muhammad and his grandson Husain ibn Ali.

People
 Sayyid Ali Hosseini Khamenei, the supreme leader of Iran
 Abul Kalam Azad, Indian freedom fighter and 1st education minister
 Adem Hecini, Algerian athlete
 Abd al-Qadir al-Husayni, Palestinian Arab rebel commander (al-Husayni family)
 Adian Husaini, Indonesian Islamic scholar
 Ahad Hosseini, Iranian Azeri sculptor
 Arif Hussain Hussaini, Pakistani politician
 Faisal Husseini, Palestinian politician (al-Husayni family)
 Hind al-Husseini, Palestinian humanitarian (al-Husayni family)
 Homa Hosseini, Iranian rower
 Hussein el-Husseini, Lebanese statesman, former speaker of the Lebanese parliament
 Jalal Hosseini, Iranian footballer
 Kamil al-Husayni, Palestinian judge (al-Husayni family)
 Karim al-Hussayni, Imam of the Ismaili Muslims and the fourth Aga Khan
 Khaled Hosseini, American novelist and physician
 Malek Hosseini (born 1968), an Iranian philosopher
 Mansoor Hosseini, Swedish composer
 Mansooreh Hosseini, Iranian contemporary artist
 Mehdi Hosseini, Persian composer
 Mohammed al-Husseini, Lebanese-Canadian member of Hezbollah
 Mohammad Amin al-Husayni, Palestinian Arab nationalist (al-Husayni family)
 Mohammad Hosseini, Iranian politician
 M. Yousuff Hussaini, American applied mathematician
 Nasrin Husseini, Afghani refugee advocate, veterinary researcher, and food activist
 Rana Husseini, Jordanian journalist
 Saeed al-Husayni, Wazir of Sylhet
 Shahab Hosseini, Iranian actor
 Shamseddin Hosseini, Iranian politician
 Syed Shah Mohammed Hussaini, Indian educationalist
 Seyyed Ali Hussaini Sistani, Iranian Shia Marja' in Iraq
 seyyed Ebrahim Raisi, Iranian politician
 seyyed  Mirza Shirazi Iranian Shiite marja and Leader of Persian  Tobacco Protests

See also
 Hussein
 Al-Husayni, Palestinian Arab clan 
 Hussaini (Hunza), Valley in Pakistan

Arabic-language surnames
Iranian-language surnames
Shi'ite surnames
Patronymic surnames
Surnames from given names